Scopula eurata is a moth of the family Geometridae. It was described by Prout in 1913. It is found in Turkmenistan.

References

Moths described in 1913
eurata
Moths of Asia
Taxa named by Louis Beethoven Prout